Ballas is a variety of non-gem-grade diamond.

Ballas may also refer to:

People 
 Corky Ballas (born 1960), American ballroom dancer
 George Ballas (1925–2011), American entrepreneur
 Gustavo Ballas (born 1958), Argentine boxer
 Mark Ballas (born 1986), American dancer
 Panagiotis Ballas (born 1993), Greek football player
 Shirley Ballas (born 1960), British ballroom dancer
 Zois Ballas (born 1987), Greek basketball player

Other uses 
 Ballas Transit Center, a bus transit terminal in Missouri, US
 The Ballas, a fictional street gang in the video games Grand Theft Auto: San Andreas and Grand Theft Auto V
Ballas, an antagonistic member of the Orokin race in the video game Warframe

See also 
 Ballers